The 2014 Shell Advance Asia Talent Cup  was the inaugural season of the Asia Talent Cup. Japanese rider Kaito Toba won the cup ahead of Yuta Date and Takuma Kunimine.

Entry list

Calendar
The following Grand prix were the scheduled Grand prix for the 2014 Asia Talent Cup.

Results and standings

Grand Prix
The following results are the official race results of the 2014 Asia Talent Cup.

Riders' championship

Scoring System

Points are awarded to the top fifteen finishers. A rider has to finish the race to earn points.

{|
|

References

2014 in motorcycle sport
2014